Google Search Console is a web service by Google which allows webmasters to check indexing status, search queries, crawling errors and optimize visibility of their websites. 

Until 20 May 2015, the service was called Google Webmaster Tools. In January 2018, Google introduced a new version of the search console, with changes to the user interface. In September of 2019, old Search Console reports, including the home and dashboard pages, were removed.

Features
The service includes tools that let webmasters

 Monitor website's performance in Google search results. 
 Submit and check a sitemap.
 Check the crawl rate, and view statistics about when Googlebot accesses a particular site.
 Write and check a robots.txt file to help discover pages that are blocked in robots.txt accidentally.
 List internal and external pages that link to the website.
 Get a list of links which Googlebot had difficulty in crawling, including the error that Googlebot received when accessing the URLs in question.
 Set a preferred domain (e.g. prefer example.com over www.example.com or vice versa), which determines how the site URL is displayed in SERPs.
 Highlight to Google Search elements of structured data which are used to enrich search hit entries (released in December 2012 as Google Data Highlighter).
View site speed reports from the Chrome User Experience Report.
Receive notifications from Google for manual penalties.
 Provide access to an API to add, change and delete listings and list crawl errors.
 Check the security issues if there are any with the website. (Hacked Site or Malware Attacks)
 Add or remove the property owners and associates of the web property.

See also
 Bing Webmaster Tools
 Google Insights for Search
 Google Analytics
 Schema.org

References

External links
Google Search Console (New version)

Internet properties established in 2006
Search Console
Search engine webmaster tools